In organoboron chemistry, the Brellochs reaction provides a way to generate the monocarboranes.  The use of acetylenes to insert two carbons into boron hydrides is well established. The Brellochs method uses formaldehyde to insert single carbon atoms into boron hydrides.

Illustrative is the synthesis of CB9H14− from commercially available decaborane.
B10H14 +  CH2O  + 2 OH−  +  H2O  →  CB9H14−  +  B(OH)4−  +  H2
Oxidation of the arachno anion gives nido-6-CB9H12−.  Base degradation of the latter gives arachno-4-CB8H14.

References
 

Organoboron compounds
Cluster chemistry